Charles D Sutherland (1879–1957) was a Canadian architect who served as Chief Dominion Architect from 1936–1947. Ewart apprenticed under John Albert Ewart from 1897 to 1901 and studied at the Ottawa School of Art. As chief government architect he was responsible for many of the federal buildings constructed in this period.  Drawings for public buildings such as Post Office Buildings and Dominion Public Buildings designed by Sutherland and his staff during his tenure as Chief Architect of the Department of Public Works are now held at the National Archives of Canada. Joseph Charles Gustave Brault, (1886–1954) succeeded Charles D. Sutherland as Chief Architect of the federal Dept. of Public Works in 1947.

Career 
As federal architect, 1936–1947, Charles D. Sutherland oversaw the design and construction of public buildings such as post offices, customs offices, and armouries across Canada. He designed a Customs Building in St. Jean, Quebec, Richelieu Street, (1939) and Armstrong, Quebec, Canadian Customs Border Station, (1940). He designed several buildings in Ottawa, Ontario including: Wind Tunnel and Administration Building, Hwy. 17 at Skead Road (1939–40); Temporary Office Buildings No. 5 and No. 6, (1942). He designed the Daly Building Annex, Mackenzie Avenue near Wellington Street, Ottawa, Ontario, 1942. He designed a Veterans Hospital, 4th Street West at 12th Avenue West, Calgary, Alberta, 1942.

Works 

Charles D. Sutherland, Chief Dominion Architect 1936–1947

References 

Canadian architects
Artists from Ottawa
1879 births
1957 deaths